Scopula immorata, the Lewes wave, is a moth of the family Geometridae. It is found throughout Europe and the Near East.

The moth flies in two generations from the end of June to mid August in western Europe.

The larva feeds on various low-growing plants like thyme and oregano. Mating occurs from the males seeking out females in simple courtship behavior, taking place at ~6-10am for an hour to an hour and a half.

Subspecies
Scopula immorata immorata
Scopula immorata duercki Sheljuzhko, 1955

References

External links
Lewes wave on UKmoths
Fauna Europaea
Lepiforum.de
Vlindernet.nl 

Moths described in 1758
Moths of Europe
Moths of Asia
immorata
Taxa named by Carl Linnaeus